The Belgian Infantry Memorial is a monument in Brussels, Belgium, which stands in memory of the Belgian foot soldiers who fought in World War I and World War II. Designed by Edouard Vereycken, the memorial stands in front of Brussels' Palace of Justice and across the / from the Anglo-Belgian War Memorial. The memorial rests on a raised platform that overlooks Brussels' city centre. Translated into English, the inscription reads: "To the infantrymen who died for their country".

See also

 History of Brussels

References

Notes

Buildings and structures in Brussels
Tourist attractions in Brussels
City of Brussels
Monuments and memorials in Belgium
World War I memorials in Belgium